Kord Neshin (also Romanized as Kord Neshīn; also known as Kord Eshin, Kord Īshīn, Kūrdashī, and Kyurdashin) is a village in Gowharan Rural District, in the Central District of Khoy County, West Azerbaijan Province, Iran. At the 2006 census, its population was 525, in 129 families.

References 

Populated places in Khoy County